Hugh Ruthven Pym (born 18 October 1959) is a British journalist and author. A financial and political journalist by origin, he currently works for BBC News as its health editor.

Early life and education
Hugh Pym was born on 18 October 1959 in Malmesbury, Wiltshire. He was educated at Marlborough College, a private school in Wiltshire. He went on to read Philosophy, Politics, and Economics at Christ Church, Oxford. He graduated with a Bachelor of Arts (BA) in 1981. He undertook post-graduate study in Broadcast Journalism at Falmouth College and gained a Certificate in Journalism Cert.Jour

His great-grandfather was Walter Pym, a bishop, and his great-uncle was Leslie Ruthven Pym, a Conservative MP, whose son was Francis Pym, Baron Pym, who was notably Secretary of State for Foreign Affairs during the Falklands War. His grandfather was Leslie's brother Thomas Wentworth Pym, a vicar. His mother was a member of the Clark family (who own Clarks Shoes, with Hugh being a minor shareholder).

Career
Pym began his career in radio at Viking Radio in Hull, and was a BBC Radio journalist from 1986 to 1987. He was the producer of Business Daily at Channel 4 from 1987 to 1988, a correspondent with ITN from 1988 to 1998, and a freelance broadcaster with Sky Television from 1999 to 2000. He rejoined the BBC in 2001 after a spell of work at Sky News. He was a BBC special correspondent covering economics until 2008, when he took on the role of acting economics editor during the maternity leave of Stephanie Flanders. Following her return, he became the BBC's chief economics correspondent, a newly created role. When she left the BBC in late 2013 he took over again as acting editor. In March 2014 he was appointed as health editor.

Pym has published What Happened? And Other Questions About the Credit Crunch, a book co-written with Nick Kochan, and a study of Gordon Brown's first year in the office of Chancellor of the Exchequer, also co-written with Kochan. His latest book is Inside the Banking Crisis (published by Bloomsbury in 2014).

Pym was the recipient of the 2020 British Journalism Review Charles Wheeler award in recognition of his coverage of the COVID-19 pandemic. It was bestowed upon him in a ceremony on 16 November, when a keynote speech was delivered by Sir Peter Bazalgette. On 8 December, Pym tweeted that the second person to get the Pfizer-BioNTech COVID-19 vaccine was a man named William Shakespeare from Warwickshire. The tweet went viral due to the man's name and home county being the same as that of the renowned playwright William Shakespeare.

Parliamentary candidacy
In the 2001 general election Pym stood as the Liberal Democrat parliamentary candidate in the North Wiltshire constituency. He achieved 20,212 votes but lost to the Conservative James Gray.

Personal life
Pym is married to Dumbarton-born Susan Neill. He has three children – two sons and one daughter – and is an Elder in the Church of Scotland.

Publications
The Guinness Affair: Anatomy of a Scandal (London, Christopher Helm Publishers, 1987), with Nick Kochan
Unit and Investment Trusts (Allied Dunbar Money Guides) (London, Sweet & Maxwell, 1988)Gordon Brown: The First Year in Power (London, Bloomsbury, 1998), with Nick KochanInside the Banking Crisis'' (London, Bloomsbury, 2014)

References

External links
Profile at BBC News
 

1959 births
Living people
People educated at Marlborough College
Writers from Malmesbury
Alumni of Christ Church, Oxford
ITN newsreaders and journalists
BBC newsreaders and journalists
English television journalists
Liberal Democrats (UK) parliamentary candidates
People educated at Cothill House